GameOverZeus is a peer-to-peer botnet based on components from the earlier ZeuS trojan. The malware was created by Russian hacker Evgeniy Mikhailovich Bogachev. It is believed to have been spread through use of the Cutwail botnet.

Unlike its predecessor the ZeuS trojan, Gameover ZeuS uses an encrypted peer-to-peer communication system to communicate between its nodes and its command and control servers, greatly reducing its vulnerability to law enforcement operations. The algorithm used appears to be modeled on the Kademlia P2P protocol.

Scammers control and monitor Gameover ZeuS via command and control (C&C) servers. The virus establishes the connection to the server as soon as its malicious executable installs on the computer, at which point it can disable certain system processes, download and launch executables, or delete essential system files, making the system unusable.

According to a report by Symantec, Gameover ZeuS has largely been used for banking fraud and distribution of the CryptoLocker ransomware.

The top infected countries were US, Italy, UAE, Japan, India and the UK.

Evgeniy Mikhailovich Bogachev
In early June 2014, the U.S. Department of Justice announced that an international inter-agency collaboration named Operation Tovar had succeeded in temporarily cutting communication between Gameover ZeuS and its command and control servers. This was an effort to shut down the Evgeniy Mikhailovich Bogachev criminal infrastructure and liberate computers infected with GameOver ZeuS. 

"He has been indicted in the United States, accused of creating a sprawling network of virus-infected computers to siphon hundreds of millions of dollars from bank accounts around the world, targeting anyone with enough money worth stealing." In a widely circulated photo, he is pictured holding a domestic Bengal cat.

Bitdefender  has identified two Gameover ZeuS variants in the wild: one of them generates 1,000 domains per day and the other generates 10,000 per day.

FBI Reward
On 24 February 2015, the FBI announced a reward of up to $3 million in exchange for information regarding alleged Russian cybercriminal Evgeniy Mikhailovich Bogachev (also known online as "Slavik", "lucky12345", "Pollingsoon", "Monstr", "IOO" and "Nu11") over his suspected association with Gameover ZeuS.

The FBI reward of $3 million was the highest ever for a cybercriminal. until on Thursday, 5 December 2019, the F.B.I. issued a $5 million reward for the leader of the 'Evil Corp' hacker group, Maksim Viktorovich Yakubets for the development and deployment of the Dridex banking trojan virus.

See also
 Conficker
 Command and control (malware)
 Operation Tovar
 Russian interference in the 2016 United States elections
 Timeline of computer viruses and worms
 Tiny Banker Trojan
 Torpig
 Zeus (malware)
 Zombie (computer science)

References 

Botnets
Peer-to-peer computing
Windows trojans
Hacking in the 2010s